Crafting Mama, known in Japan as Craft Mama (クラフトママ Kurafuto Mama) and in the PAL region as Cooking Mama World: Hobbies and Fun, is a crafting simulation-styled minigame compilation video game developed by Cooking Mama Limited that was released on Nintendo DS during October 2010. It is a spin-off from the Cooking Mama series.

Gameplay
As with the previous versions of the Cooking Mama series, this game focuses on mini-games. The player chooses an object to craft, which is done through a variable number of mini-games. Crafting Mama introduces the "crafting games", where you can play a mini-game related to the crafted piece. The objects crafted by the player can be used in the customization of the Mama and some of the elements on the game's GUI.

Reception

The game received "favorable" reviews according to video game review aggregator Metacritic.  In Japan, Famitsu gave it a score of two eights, one six, and one seven, for a total of 29 out of 40.  One of its editors wrote, "It's a simple game with no story aspect to it, but this no-frills approach makes it easy to lose yourself in the gameplay. You do have arrows pointing out what to do, but otherwise there isn't a ton of guidance, which really makes it feel like you're crafting something original."  Others, however, disagreed, saying, "It's a little weird to get penalized for failing to do things that have nothing to do with actual craftwork, like tapping the screen at the right moment. Some of the minigames are too hard to follow, and it seems like you're judged too harshly on them as well."

References

External links
Official Crafting Mama Japanese website
Official Crafting Mama Website

2010 video games
505 Games games
Cooking Mama
Minigame compilations
Nintendo DS games
Nintendo DS-only games
Taito games
Majesco Entertainment games
Simulation video games
Video games developed in Japan